Peleaga (Vârful Peleaga) is a mountain in Romania. Peleaga is located in  Hunedoara County, and lies within the historical region of Transylvania.

In addition to its highest peak Peleaga, the Retezat Mountains, part of the Southern Carpathians, are home to some of the highest massifs in Romania. The area also contains the Retezat National Park, Romania's first national park.

See also
 List of European ultra prominent peaks

References

External links
 "Vârful Peleaga, Romania" on Peakbagger
 Pictures and images from the Carpathian Mountains
 Maps of the Retezat
 Jiu Valley Portal - Romania's principal coalmining region and a gateway to the Retezat National Park

Mountains of Romania
Mountains of the Southern Carpathians

de:Retezatgebirge
ro:Munţii Retezat